The 1950–51 season was Mansfield Town's 13th season in the Football League and ninth season in the Third Division North, they finished in 2nd position with 64 points.

Final league table

Results

Football League Third Division North

FA Cup

Squad statistics
 Squad list sourced from

References
General
 Mansfield Town 1950–51 at soccerbase.com (use drop down list to select relevant season)

Specific

Mansfield Town F.C. seasons
Mansfield Town